Dieter Kindlmann and Marcel Zimmermann were the defending champions, but Kindlmann chose not to compete this year.
Zimmermann played with Kevin Krawietz, however they lost to Philipp Oswald and Mischa Zverev in the quarterfinals.Frank Moser and Lukáš Rosol won the final 6–0, 7–5 against Hans Podlipnik and Max Raditschnigg.

Seeds
The top three seeds received a bye into the second round.

Main draw

Draw

References
Main Draw

Oberstaufen Cup - Doubles
Oberstaufen Cup